Buttle v Saunders [1950] 2 All ER 193 is an English trusts law case, which held that a trustee has a duty to gazump, or break an agreement which has not quite been completed into a formal and binding contract.

Facts
The defendant trustee agreed to sell Mrs Simpson some land for £6,142. A beneficiary of the trust then offered £6,500 for the same land. The trustee refused, since he had already come to an informal agreement with Mrs Simpson. The beneficiary applied for an injunction against the sale to Mrs Simpson, alleging the duty was to obtain the highest price.

Judgment
Wynn-Parry J granted the injunction saying,

See also
Cowan v Scargill

Notes

References

English trusts case law
High Court of Justice cases
1950 in British law
1950 in case law